Filice is a surname. Notable people with the surname include: 

Fabio Filice (born 1981), Canadian football player
Francis P. Filice (1922–2015), American priest
Jim Filice (born 1962), American motorcycle racer

See also
Felice
Filipe